Euer is a surname. Notable people with the surname include:

 Dawn Euer (born 1979), American politician
 Ralph Euer ( 1350–1422), English knight

See also
 Auer (surname)